Dermestes murinus is a species of beetle in family Dermestidae. It is found in the Palearctic

References

Dermestidae
Beetles described in 1758
Taxa named by Carl Linnaeus